The Old Customs House of Humacao (Spanish: Antigua Aduana de Humacao) is a historic building located in Punta Santiago, in the municipality of Humacao, Puerto Rico. The structure was designed in the Spanish Colonial style, architecturally and typologically and finished in 1872 by the Department of Public Works of the Spanish Government in Puerto Rico. Until this time, the customs house was a temporary wooden building, so the need for a permanent structure made it possible that, in 1865, it was decided to construct the present building to serve as the new customs house at Punta Santiago.

The structure served as a school building, named the Francisco Isern School, during the 20th century until it was abandoned. It was added to the United States National Register of Historic Places on May 18, 1995.

Gallery

References 

National Register of Historic Places in Humacao, Puerto Rico
Custom houses on the National Register of Historic Places
Government buildings completed in 1872
Government buildings on the National Register of Historic Places in Puerto Rico
1870s establishments in Puerto Rico
Unused buildings in Puerto Rico
1872 establishments in the Spanish Empire